The communauté de communes des Vals de Cher et d’Arnon was located in the Cher département of the Centre-Val de Loire  region of France. It was created in January 2000. It was merged into the new Communauté de communes Cœur de Berry in January 2017.

It comprised the following 12 communes:

Brinay 
Cerbois
Chéry 
Lazenay 
Limeux 
Lury-sur-Arnon
Massay 
Méreau 
Poisieux
Preuilly 
Quincy
Sainte-Thorette

References 

Vals de Cher et d'Arnon